Pléneau Island is an island,  long, lying just northeast of Hovgaard Island in the Wilhelm Archipelago. Charted as a peninsula of Hovgaard Island by the French Antarctic Expedition, 1903–05, under J.B. Charcot, who named its northeast point for Paul Pléneau, photographer of the expedition. The feature was first shown to be an island on an Argentine government chart of 1957.

See also 
 List of Antarctic and sub-Antarctic islands

References

Further reading
 Antarctic Treaty Visitor Site Guide for Pléneau Island.

Islands of the Wilhelm Archipelago